Higher Than the Stars is the second EP by the New York indie band the Pains of Being Pure at Heart released on September 22, 2009. The EP was announced July 23 of 2009.

Track listing

iTunes Digital Track listing

 "Higher Than the Stars" – 3:49
 "103" – 2:03
 "Falling Over" – 3:11
 "Twins" – 3:18
 "Higher Than The Stars (Saint Etienne Visits Lord Spank Mix)" – 6:48 
 "Falling Over (DJ Downfall Sprechenbann Mix)" – 3:12 (iTunes bonus track)
 "Higher Than the Stars (Skanfrom Remix)" – 4:46 (iTunes bonus track)
 "Higher Than the Stars (Others In Conversation Remix)" – 3:59 (iTunes bonus track)

CD Track listing

 "Higher Than the Stars" – 3:49
 "103" – 2:03
 "Falling Over" – 3:11
 "Twins" – 3:18
 "Higher Than The Stars (Saint Etienne Visits Lord Spank Mix)" – 6:48

12" EP Track Listing

 "Higher Than the Stars" – 3:49
 "103" – 2:03
 "Falling Over" – 3:11
 "Twins" – 3:18

12" Remix EP Track Listing

 "Higher Than The Stars (Saint Etienne Visits Lord Spank Mix)" – 6:48 
 "Falling Over (DJ Downfall Sprechenbann Mix)" – 3:12
 "Higher Than the Stars (Skanfrom Remix)" – 4:46

7" Single (Clear Vinyl)

 "Higher Than the Stars" – 3:49
 "Higher Than the Stars (Others In Conversation Remix)" – 3:59

References

External links
Higher Than the Stars at WikiFur - describes the use of fursuits in the music video for "Higher Than the Stars"

The Pains of Being Pure at Heart albums
2009 EPs